FC Kobrin is a Belarusian football club based in Kobrin, Brest Oblast.

History
FC Kobrin was founded in 1992 in the city of Brest as Brestbytkhim Brest. The team made its debut in Belarusian Second League in 1992–93 season, and after winning the league from the first attempt they were promoted to the First League. In 1996, the team relocated to its current location in Kobrin, Brest Voblast. In early 1997 the team withdrew to the amateur level due to financial troubles. Kobrin returned to the Second League for 1998 and 1999 seasons and then again for one more season in 2006. In between these years and since 2007 Kobrin played on amateur level in Brest Oblast championship. The team also made a number of appearances in Belarusian Cup in recent seasons. Since 2013, the team once again rejoined Second League, and in 2014 joined First League replacing withdrawn Minsk-2. Since 2016 they returned to Brest Oblast league. Since 2016 they perform as Atlant Kobrin due to sponsorship deal.

In 2021 Kobrin rejoined Second League, after its expansion.

Current squad 
As of August 2022

External links
Profile at footballfacts.ru

Football clubs in Belarus
Association football clubs established in 1992
Association football clubs established in 1996
1992 establishments in Belarus